Turkmen (or , ,), sometimes referred to as "Turkmen Turkic" or "Turkmen Turkish", is a Turkic language spoken by the Turkmens of Central Asia. It has an estimated 5 million native speakers in Turkmenistan (where it is the official language), and a further 719,000 speakers in northeastern Iran and 1.5 million people in northwestern Afghanistan, where it has no official status. Turkmen is also spoken to lesser varying degrees in Turkmen communities of Uzbekistan and Tajikistan and by diaspora communities, primarily in Turkey and Russia.

Turkmen is a member of the Oghuz branch of the Turkic languages. It is closely related to Azerbaijani, Crimean Tatar, Gagauz, Qashqai, and Turkish, sharing varying degrees of mutual intelligibility with each of those languages. However, the closest language of Turkmen is considered Khorasani Turkic, spoken in northeastern regions of Iran and with which it shares the eastern subbranch of Oghuz languages, as well as Khorazm, the Oghuz dialect of Uzbek language spoken mainly in Khorezm along the Turkmenistan border. Elsewhere in Iran, the Turkmen language comes second after the Azerbaijani language in terms of the number of speakers of Turkic languages of Iran.

The standardized form of Turkmen (spoken in Turkmenistan) is based on the Teke dialect, while Iranian Turkmen use mostly the Yomud dialect, and Afghan Turkmen use the Ersary variety. The Turkmen language, unlike other languages of the Oghuz branch, preserved most of the unique and archaic features of the language spoken by the early Oghuz Turks, including phonemic vowel length.

Turkmen people should not be confused with the unrelated Iraqi and Syrian "Turkmen" people, who speak dialects that form a continuum between Turkish and Azerbaijani, in both cases heavily influenced by Arabic. These varieties are not Turkmen in the sense of this article.

Classification 

Turkmen is a member of the East Oghuz branch of the Turkic family of languages; its closest relatives being Turkish and Azerbaijani, with which it shares a relatively high degree of mutual intelligibility. However, the closest language of Turkmen is considered Khorasani Turkic with which it shares the eastern subbranch of Oghuz languages and Khorazm, spoken mainly in northwestern Uzbekistan.

Turkmen has vowel harmony, is agglutinative and has no grammatical gender. Word order is subject–object–verb.

Written Turkmen today is based on the Teke (Tekke) dialect. The Teke dialect is sometimes (especially in Afghanistan) referred to as "Chagatai", but like all Turkmen dialects it reflects only a limited influence from classical Chagatai.

Comparison with other Turkic languages 
The only other Turkic language with a similar feature is Bashkir.

Turkmen vs. Azerbaijani 
The same is true for demonstrative pronouns "bu", where sound "b" is replaced with sound "m". For example: . In Turkmen, "bu" undergoes some changes just as in: .

Here are some words with a different pronunciation in Turkmen and Azerbaijani that mean the same in both languages:

Turkmen vs. Turkish 
Turkey was first to recognize Turkmenistan's independence on 27 October 1991, following the Dissolution of the Soviet Union and to open its Embassy in Ashgabat on 29 February 1992. Sharing a common history, religion, language and culture, the two states have balanced special relations based on mutual respect and the principle of "One Nation, Two States".

Turkmen language is very close to Turkish with regard to linguistic properties. However, there are a couple of differences due to regional and historical reasons. Most morphophonetic rules are common in Turkmen and Turkish languages. For instance, both languages show vowel harmony and consonant mutation rules, and have similar suffixes with very close semantics.

Here are some words from the Swadesh list in Turkmen and Turkish that mean the same in both languages:

Phonology

Writing system 

Turkmen written language was formed in the 13–14th centuries. During this period, the Arabic alphabet was used extensively for writing. Already in the 18th century, there was a rich literature in the Turkmen language. At the same time, the literacy of the population in their native language remained at low levels; book publishing was extremely limited, and the first primer in the Turkmen language appeared only in 1913, while the first newspaper ("Transcaspian native newspaper") was printed in 1914.

The Arabic script was not adapted to the phonetic features of the Turkic languages. Thus, it did not have necessary signs to designate specific sounds of the Turkmen language, and at the same time there were many letters to designate Arabic sounds that were not in the Turkmen language.

During the first years after the establishment of the Soviet power, the Arabic alphabet of the Turkmens of the USSR was reformed twice, in 1922 and 1925. In the course of the reforms, letters with diacritics were introduced to denote Turkic phonemes; and letters were abolished for sounds that are absent in the Turkmen language.

The Turkmens of Afghanistan and Iran continue to use Arabic script.

In January 1925, on the pages of the republican newspaper , the question of switching to a new, Latin alphabet was raised. After the first All-Union Turkological Congress in Baku (February–March 1926), the State Academic Council under the People's Commissariat of Education of the Turkmen SSR developed a draft of a new alphabet. On January 3, 1928, the revised new Latin alphabet was approved by the Central Executive Committee of the Turkmen SSR.

At the end of the 1930s, the process of the Cyrillization of writing began throughout the USSR. In January 1939, the newspaper "Sowet Türkmenistany" published a letter from teachers in Ashgabat and the Ashgabat region with an initiative to replace the Turkmen (Latin) script with Cyrillic. The Presidium of the Supreme Soviet of the Turkmen SSR instructed the Research Institute of Language and Literature to draw up a draft of a new alphabet. The teachers of the Ashgabat Pedagogical Institute and print workers also took part in the development of the new writing system. In April 1940, the draft alphabet was published.

In May 1940, the Council of People's Commissars of the Turkmen SSR adopted a resolution on the transition to a new alphabet of all state and public institutions from July 1, 1940, and on the beginning of teaching the new alphabet in schools from September 1 of the same year.

After the Dissolution of the Soviet Union, in January 1993, a meeting was held at the Academy of Sciences of Turkmenistan on the issue of replacing the Cyrillic with the Latin alphabet, at which a commission was formed to develop the alphabet. In February, a new version of the alphabet was published in the press. On April 12, 1993, the Mejlis of Turkmenistan approved a presidential decree on the new alphabet.

Grammar 

Turkmen is a highly agglutinative language, in that much of the grammar is expressed by means of suffixes added to nouns and verbs. It is very regular compared with many other languages of non-Turkic group. For example,  "from the villages" can be analysed as  "village", -lar (plural suffix), -dan (ablative case, meaning "from");  "I am taking" as al "take",  (present continuous tense), -yn (1st person singular).

Another characteristic of Turkmen is vowel harmony.

Literature

Turkmen literature comprises oral compositions and written texts in Old Oghuz Turkic and Turkmen languages. Turkmens are direct descendants of the Oghuz Turks, who were a western Turkic people that spoke the Oghuz branch of the Turkic language family.

The earliest development of the Turkmen literature is closely associated with the literature of the Oghuz Turks.
Turkmens have joint claims to a great number of literary works written in Old Oghuz and Persian (by Seljuks in 11-12th centuries) languages with other people of the Oghuz Turkic origin, mainly of Azerbaijan and Turkey. These works include, but are not limited to the Book of Dede Korkut, Gorogly, Layla and Majnun, Yusuf Zulaikha and others.

There is general consensus, however, that distinctively modern Turkmen literature originated in the 18th century with the poetry of Magtymguly Pyragy, who is considered the father of the Turkmen literature.

Vocabulary

Numbers 

Note: Numbers are formed identically to other Turkic languages, such as Turkish. So, eleven (11) is "on bir".

Colors

Basic expressions

Example
The following is Magtymguly's  (of the Turkmen) poem with the text transliterated into Turkmen (Latin) letters, whereas the original language is preserved. Second column is the poem's Turkish translation, third one is the Azerbaijani translation, while the last one is the English translation.

Turkmen in Iran
Turkmens in Iran speak a dialect of Turkmen in the province of Golestan.  It is mutually intelligible with the Turkmen dialects in Afghanistan, and are written in the Nastaliq script.

Notes

Further reading

References

Bibliography
Garrett, Jon, Meena Pallipamu, and Greg Lastowka (1996). "Turkmen Grammar". www.chaihana.com.

External links 

 Turkmen grammar and orthography rules (Turkmen) (in Turkmen)
 Turkmen – English Dictionary with searchable reverse dictionary
 Turkmen – English / English – Turkmen Dictionary (a) 
 Turkmen – English / English – Turkmen Dictionary (b)  
 Turkmen – English Dictionary
 Turkmen – English / English – Turkmen Dictionary (Freelang)
 Omniglot page on Turkmen
 Turkmen language online transliteration 
 Ajapsozluk.com Ever-growing dictionary of Turkmen language
 Turkmen<>Turkish dictionary (Pamukkale University)

 
Turkic languages
Agglutinative languages
Languages of Turkmenistan
Turkic languages of Afghanistan
Languages of Iran
Languages of Pakistan
Languages of Russia
Oghuz languages